Sculpture of Stone is the third album on a major record label by the Polish death metal band Dies Irae released in 2004.

Track listing

Credits
Marcin "Novy" Nowak - bass, vocals
Maurycy "Mauser" Stefanowicz - guitars
Jacek Hiro - guitars
Krzysztof "Doc" Raczkowski - drums
Jacek Wiśniewski - cover art, layout
Sławomir Wiesławski, Wojciech Wiesławski - sound engineering, producer, mixing
Mariusz Kmiołek - photography

References
   

2004 albums
Dies Irae (band) albums
Metal Mind Productions albums